Hand, foot, and mouth disease (HFMD) is a common infection caused by a group of enteroviruses. It typically begins with a fever and feeling generally unwell. This is followed a day or two later by flat discolored spots or bumps that may blister, on the hands, feet and mouth and occasionally buttocks and groin. Signs and symptoms normally appear 3–6 days after exposure to the virus. The rash generally resolves on its own in about a week. Fingernail and toenail loss may occur a few weeks later, but they will regrow with time.

The viruses that cause HFMD are spread through close personal contact, through the air from coughing and the feces of an infected person. Contaminated objects can also spread the disease. Coxsackievirus A16 is the most common cause, and enterovirus 71 is the second-most common cause. Other strains of coxsackievirus and enterovirus can also be responsible. Some people may carry and pass on the virus despite having no symptoms of disease. Other animals are not involved. Diagnosis can often be made based on symptoms. Occasionally, a throat or stool sample may be tested for the virus.

Most people with hand, foot, and mouth disease get better on their own in 7 to 10 days. Most cases require no specific treatment. No antiviral medication or vaccine is available, but development efforts are underway. For fever and for painful mouth sores, over-the-counter pain medications such as ibuprofen may be used, though aspirin should be avoided in children. The illness is usually not serious. Occasionally, intravenous fluids are given to children who are dehydrated. Very rarely, viral meningitis or encephalitis may complicate the disease. Because HFMD is normally mild, children can continue to go to child care and schools as long as they have no fever or uncontrolled drooling with mouth sores, and as long as they feel well enough to participate in classroom activities. 

HFMD occurs in all areas of the world. It often occurs in small outbreaks in nursery schools or kindergartens. Large outbreaks have been occurring in Asia since 1997. It usually occurs during the spring, summer and fall months. Typically it occurs in children less than five years old but can occasionally occur in adults. HFMD should not be confused with foot-and-mouth disease (also known as hoof-and-mouth disease), which mostly affects livestock.

Signs and symptoms 

Common constitutional signs and symptoms of the HFMD include fever, nausea, vomiting, feeling tired, generalized discomfort, loss of appetite, and irritability in infants and toddlers. Skin lesions frequently develop in the form of a rash of flat discolored spots and bumps which may be followed by vesicular sores with blisters on palms of the hands, soles of the feet, buttocks, and sometimes on the lips. The rash is rarely itchy for children, but can be extremely itchy for adults. Painful facial ulcers, blisters, or lesions may also develop in or around the nose or mouth. HFMD usually resolves on its own after 7–10 days. Most cases of the disease are relatively harmless, but complications including encephalitis, meningitis, and paralysis that mimics the neurological symptoms of polio can occur.

Cause
The viruses that cause the disease are of the Picornaviridae family. Coxsackievirus A16 is the most common cause of HFMD. Enterovirus 71 (EV-71) is the second-most common cause. Many other strains of coxsackievirus and enterovirus can also be responsible.

Transmission
HFMD is highly contagious and is transmitted by nasopharyngeal secretions such as saliva or nasal mucus, by direct contact, or by fecal–oral transmission. It is possible to be infectious for days to weeks after the symptoms have resolved.

Child care settings are the most common places for HFMD to be contracted because of toilet training, diaper changes, and the fact that children often put their hands into their mouths. HFMD is contracted through nose and throat secretions such as saliva, sputum, nasal mucus and as well as fluid in blisters, and stool.

Diagnosis
A diagnosis usually can be made by the presenting signs and symptoms alone. If the diagnosis is unclear, a throat swab or stool specimen may be taken to identify the virus by culture. The common incubation period (the time between infection and onset of symptoms) ranges from three to six days. Early detection of HFMD is important in preventing an outbreak in the pediatric population.

Prevention
Preventive measures include avoiding direct contact with infected individuals (including keeping infected children home from school), proper cleaning of shared utensils, disinfecting contaminated surfaces, and proper hand hygiene. These measures have been shown to be effective in decreasing the transmission of the viruses responsible for HFMD.

Protective habits include hand washing and disinfecting surfaces in play areas. Breast-feeding has also shown to decrease rates of severe HFMD, though does not reduce the risk for the infection of the disease.

Vaccine
A vaccine known as the EV71 vaccine is available to prevent HFMD in China .  No vaccine is currently available in the United States.

Treatment
Medications are usually not needed as hand, foot, and mouth disease is a viral disease that typically resolves on its own. Currently, there is no specific curative treatment for hand, foot and mouth disease. Disease management typically focuses on achieving symptomatic relief. Pain from the sores may be eased with the use of analgesic medications. Infection in older children, adolescents, and adults is typically mild and lasts approximately 1 week, but may occasionally run a longer course. Fever reducers can help decrease body temperature.

In 2018, National Health Commission of China assembled a panel of experts to revise their guidelines for the diagnosis and treatment of hand, foot and mouth disease. Consumption of Traditional Chinese medicine, prescribed by certified physicians, are recommended to clear the symptoms.

A minority of individuals with hand, foot and mouth disease may require hospital admission due to complications such as inflammation of the brain, inflammation of the meninges, or acute flaccid paralysis. Non-neurologic complications such as inflammation of the heart, fluid in the lungs, or bleeding into the lungs may also occur.

Complications
Complications from the viral infections that cause HFMD are rare, but require immediate medical treatment if present. HFMD infections caused by Enterovirus 71 tend to be more severe and are more likely to have neurologic or cardiac complications including death than infections caused by Coxsackievirus A16. Viral or aseptic meningitis can occur with HFMD in rare cases and is characterized by fever, headache, stiff neck, or back pain.  The condition is usually mild and clears without treatment; however, hospitalization for a short time may be needed. Other serious complications of HFMD include encephalitis (inflammation of the brain), or flaccid paralysis in rare circumstances.

Fingernail and toenail loss have been reported in children 4–8 weeks after having HFMD. The relationship between HFMD and the reported nail loss is unclear; however, it is temporary and nail growth resumes without treatment.

Minor complications due to symptoms can occur such as dehydration, due to mouth sores causing discomfort with intake of foods and fluid.

Epidemiology
Hand, foot and mouth disease most commonly occurs in children under the age of 10 and more often under the age of 5, but it can also affect adults with varying symptoms. It tends to occur in outbreaks during the spring, summer, and autumn seasons. This is believed to be due to heat and humidity improving spread. HFMD is more common in rural areas than urban areas; however, socioeconomic status and hygiene levels need to be considered. Poor hygiene is a risk factor for HFMD.

Outbreaks
 In 1997, an outbreak occurred in Sarawak of Malaysia with 600 cases and over 30 children died.
 In 1998, there was an outbreak in Taiwan, affecting mainly children. There were 405 severe complications, and 78 children died. The total number of cases in that epidemic is estimated to have been 1.5 million.
 In 2008 an outbreak in China, beginning in March in Fuyang, Anhui, led to 25,000 infections, and 42 deaths, by May 13. Similar outbreaks were reported in Singapore (more than 2,600 cases as of April 20, 2008), Vietnam (2,300 cases, 11 deaths), Mongolia (1,600 cases), and Brunei (1053 cases from June–August 2008)
 In 2009 17 children died in an outbreak during March and April 2009 in China's eastern Shandong Province, and 18 children died in the neighboring Henan Province. Out of 115,000 reported cases in China from January to April, 773 were severe and 50 were fatal.
 In 2010 in China, an outbreak occurred in southern China's Guangxi Autonomous Region as well as Guangdong, Henan, Hebei and Shandong provinces. Until March, 70,756 children were infected and 40 died from the disease. By June, the peak season for the disease, 537 had died.
 The World Health Organization reporting between January to October 2011 (1,340,259) states the number of cases in China had dropped by approx 300,000 from 2010 (1,654,866) cases, with new cases peaking in June. There were 437 deaths, down from 2010 (537 deaths).
 In December 2011, the California Department of Public Health identified a strong form of the virus, coxsackievirus A6 (CVA6), where nail loss in children is common.
 In 2012 in Alabama, United States there was an outbreak of an unusual type of the disease. It occurred in a season when it is not usually seen and affected teenagers and older adults.  There were some hospitalizations due to the disease but no reported deaths.
 In 2012 in Cambodia, 52 of 59 reviewed cases of children reportedly dead due to a mysterious disease were diagnosed to be caused by a virulent form of HFMD. Although a significant degree of uncertainty exists with reference to the diagnosis, the WHO report states, "Based on the latest laboratory results, a significant proportion of the samples tested positive for enterovirus 71 (EV-71), which causes hand foot and mouth disease (HFMD). The EV-71 virus has been known to generally cause severe complications amongst some patients."
 HFMD infected 1,520,274 people with up to 431 deaths reported at the end of July in 2012 in China.
 In 2018, more than 50,000 cases have occurred through a nationwide outbreak in Malaysia with two deaths also reported.

India 2022 
An outbreak of an illness referred to as tomato fever or tomato flu was identified in the Kollam district on May 6, 2022. The illness is endemic to Kerala, India and gets its name because of the red and round blisters it causes, which look like tomatoes. The disease may be a new variant of the viral HFMD or an effect of chikungunya or dengue fever. Flu may be a misnomer. 

The condition mainly affects children under the age of five. An article in The Lancet states that the appearance of the blisters is similar to that seen in monkey pox, and the illness is not thought to be related to SARS-CoV-2. Symptoms, treatment and prevention are similar to HFMD.

History
HFMD cases were first described clinically in Canada and New Zealand in 1957. The disease was termed "Hand Foot and Mouth Disease", by Thomas Henry Flewett, after a similar outbreak in 1960.

Research
Novel antiviral agents to prevent and treat infection with the viruses responsible for HFMD are currently under development. Preliminary studies have shown inhibitors of the EV-71 viral capsid to have potent antiviral activity.

References

External links 

 
 

Enterovirus-associated diseases
Oral mucosal pathology
Wikipedia medicine articles ready to translate
Wikipedia emergency medicine articles ready to translate
Virus-related cutaneous conditions